Wendel Fräser (2 June 1967 in Paramaribo – 7 June 1989 in Paramaribo) was a Dutch footballer. He suited up for Feyenoord Rotterdam and RBC Roosendaal in his brief career, cut short when on 7 June 1989 he was killed in the Surinam Airways Flight PY764 air crash in Paramaribo, at the age of 22.

Fräser was a postman in Rotterdam and played in the youth squads of Feyenoord Rotterdam. Although he was known as a talented player and was promoted to the first team of Feyenoord in the 1987–88 season, he was an unused substitute on the bench. The next season, he was transferred to RBC Roosendaal where he made his professional debut. After that season he signed a new contract at SVV for whom he would have been playing from the 1989–90 season.

He was invited by Sonny Hasnoe, the founder of the Colourful 11 to be part of the team and travel to Suriname to play in the "Boxel Kleurrijk Tournament" with three Surinamese teams. The Surinam Airways Flight PY764 crashed during approach to Paramaribo-Zanderij International Airport, killing 176 of the 187 on board, including Fräser, making it the worst ever aviation disaster in Suriname's history. Among those killed were a total of 15 members of the Colourful 11, leaving three survivors from that contingent.

In memoriam of Fräser the "Wendel Man of the Match Throphy" is given to RBC's best player of the season every year. The supporters home at the RBC Stadion is also named after Fräser.

External links
 Fräser at AndroKnel.nl 
 Crash report
 De Rat.nl  
 Iwan Tol: Eindbesteming Zanderij; het vergeten verhaal van het Kleurrijk Elftal 

1967 births
1989 deaths
Sportspeople from Paramaribo
Dutch footballers
Surinamese emigrants to the Netherlands
Feyenoord players
RBC Roosendaal players
Eerste Divisie players
Association football forwards
Footballers killed in the Surinam Airways Flight 764 crash